Musnad Ahmad ibn Hanbal is a collection of musnad hadith compiled by the Islamic scholar Ahmad ibn Hanbal (d. 241 AH/855 AD) to whom the Hanbali fiqh (legislation) is attributed.

Description
It is one of the largest hadith books in Islamic history containing more than twenty-seven thousand hadiths, according to Maktaba Shamila. It is organized into compilations of the hadiths narrated by each companion, starting with "the ten who were promised Paradise". This highlights their status and the efforts they made to preserve the ahadith of Muhammad.

It is said by some that Ahmad ibn Hanbal made a comment in regard to his book which reads as follows: "I have only included a hadith in this book if it had been used as evidence by some of the scholars." Abu al-Faraj Ibn al-Jawzi ironically claimed that the Musnad contains hadiths that are fabricated by interpolation (i.e. the narrator jumbling up information, mixing texts and authoritative chains), which were said to be nine Hadiths by some, or fifteen hadiths by others. However, it is agreed that the hadith that are suspected to be fabricated are not new hadiths that are creations of a dubious narrator's imagination.

Publications
The book has been published by many organizations around the world, including: 
   Musnad Imam Ahmad Bin Muhammad Bin Hanbal: Published: Noor Foundation USA  
   English Translation Of Musnad Imam Ahmad Bin Hanbal (4 Vols) : Published: Darussalam 
 English Translation Of Musnad Imam Ahmad Bin Hanbal (5 Vols) : Published: Darussalam

See also
 List of Sunni books
 Sahih Muslim
 Jami al-Tirmidhi
 Sunan Abu Dawood
 Sunan ibn Majah
 Muwatta Malik
 Majma al-Zawa'id

Notes
The Internet Archive hosts a copy of Musnad Ahmad Volume 4 in English at https://archive.org/details/musnadahmadvol.4final.

References

External links
Methodology of Imam Ahmad (Arabic)

Sunni literature
Hadith
Hadith studies
Hadith collections
Hanbali
Sunni hadith collections